Wrestling competitions at the 2018 Commonwealth Games in Gold Coast, Australia were held between 12 and 14 April at the Carrara Sports and Leisure Centre.

Medal table

Medal summary

Men's freestyle

Women's freestyle

Participating nations
There are 23 participating nations in wrestling with a total of 105 wrestlers.

References

External links
 Results Book – Wrestling

 
2018 in sport wrestling
2018
2018 Commonwealth Games events
International wrestling competitions hosted by Australia